The Local Government Act 1986 (c 10) is an Act of the Parliament of the United Kingdom. 

The Local Government Act 1986 was passed primarily in response to the use of publicity by the Greater London Council in its attempt to prevent the passing of the Bill for the Local Government Act 1985. The Local Government Act 1986 was subsequently amended by Section 28 of the Local Government Act 1988.

Part I

Section 1
This section was repealed by section 149 of, and Part I of Schedule 13 to, the Local Government Finance Act 1988.

Part II
Sections 4A and 4B were inserted by section 39(1) of the Local Audit and Accountability Act 2014.

Section 2A

Section 28 of the Local Government Act 1988 added the now-repealed Section 2A to this Act, restricting local authorities from "promoting homosexuality".

Part III

Section 8
This section was repealed by section 194(2) of, and Part I of Schedule 12 to, the Local Government and Housing Act 1989.

See also
Local Government Act

References
Halsbury's Statutes of England and Wales. Fourth Edition. 2009 Reissue. LexisNexis. Volume 25(2). Pages 807 to 815.
"The Local Government Act 1986". Halsbury's Statutes of England. Butterworths. London. 1987. Binder 56: Continuation Binder 1986. Page 167.
Peter Allsop (ed). "Local Government Act 1986*". Current Law Statutes Annotated 1986. Sweet & Maxwell. Stevens & Sons. London. W Green & Son. Edinburgh. 1987. Volume 1. Pages 10 to 10/12.
Halsbury's Statutory Instruments. Volume 11. pp 77, 203, 204, 249 and 415.
Tom F Richardson. Public Relations in Local Government. Heinemann Professional Publishing. 1988. Pages 33 and 56 to 58.
Brian Harvey. "Public relations in local government". Sam Black (ed). Practice of Public Relations. Fourth Edition. 1995. Routledge. 2011. p 86.
Dawn Oliver. Government in the United Kingdom. Open University Press. 1991. Pages 83 and 84. Google.
Bailey and Paddison. The Reform of Local Government Finance in Britain. Routledge. London and New York. 1988. Reprinted 2006. Pages 52 and 54.

External links 
 Legislation.gov.uk

Acts of the Parliament of the United Kingdom concerning England and Wales
English criminal law
United Kingdom Acts of Parliament 1986